The Westland Widgeon was a British light aircraft of the 1920s. A single-engined parasol monoplane, the Widgeon was built in small numbers before Westland abandoned production in 1929.

Development and design
In 1924, the British Air Ministry, eager to encourage the development of cheap civil aircraft suitable for use by private owners and flying clubs, sponsored a competition for a two-seat ultralight aircraft, which had to be powered by an engine of 1100 cc displacement or less and capable of carrying a load of at least 340 lb (155 kg). To meet this requirement, Westland Aircraft produced two designs, the Woodpigeon biplane, and the Widgeon parasol monoplane.  Unable to decide which design would be superior, Westland decided to build both types.

The Widgeon first flew at Westland's Yeovil factory on 22 September 1924, eight days after the first of two Woodpigeons.  Its fuselage, which was very similar to that of the Woodpigeon, was of mixed steel tube and wooden construction, while the wooden parasol wing, which was tapered in both chord and thickness, folded for easy storage.  It was powered by a single 1,090 cc Blackburne Thrush three cylinder radial engine, which produced 35 hp (26 kW).

The Air Ministry Light Aircraft competition began at Lympne Aerodrome, Kent on 27 September. The Widgeon, which due to the use of the Thrush engine was badly underpowered (as was the Woodpigeon), crashed during the first day of trials. Despite this setback, it was clear that the Widgeon had promise and was superior to the Woodpigeon, and the damaged prototype was rebuilt with a more powerful 60 hp (45 kW) Armstrong Siddeley Genet engine as the Widgeon II.  Despite its much greater weight, the new engine transformed the Widgeon, the rebuilt aircraft being almost 40 mph (64 km/h) faster.

Based on this experience, Westland decided to enter the Widgeon into production for the private owner.  It was therefore redesigned with a simpler, constant chord, wing replacing the tapered wing of the Widgeon I and II to ease production.  The resulting Widgeon III could be powered either a radial engine like the Genet or an inline engine such as the Cirrus. The first Widgeon III flew in March 1927, with production starting later that year.  The design was further refined with a duralumin tube fuselage and a new undercarriage to produce the Widgeon IIIA.

The Widgeon proved expensive compared to its competitors and a total of only 26 of all types, including the prototype, were built and sold before production was stopped in 1930 in order to allow Westland to concentrate on the Wapiti general-purpose military aircraft and the Wessex airliner.

Variants
Widgeon I
Powered by one 35 hp Blackburne Thrush radial engine.  One built.
Widgeon II
Rebuild of Widgeon I with 60 hp Armstrong Siddeley Genet radial.
Widgeon III
Redesign for production. Powered by ADC Cirrus II or III inline engine, Genet II radial, ABC Hornet or de Havilland Gipsy. 18 built. 
Widgeon IIIA
Variant of Widgeon III with metal fuselage and new undercarriage.  Powered  by Cirrus or Gipsy engine.  Seven built.

Specifications (IIIA)

See also

References

"THE WESTLAND "WIDGEON" LIGHT MONOPLANE (No. 6)". Flight. 25 September 1924, p. 6243
"The Westland "Widgeon III"". Flight. 28 July 1928. pp. 513–518.
"The Westland "Widgeon IIIA"".  Flight. 14 March 1929. pp. 206–207.
Jackson, A.J. British Civil Aircraft 1919–1972: Volume III. London:Putnam, 1988. .
 James, Derek M. Westland Aircraft since 1915. London:Putnam, 1991. .

1920s British sport aircraft
Widgeon
Parasol-wing aircraft
Single-engined tractor aircraft
Aircraft first flown in 1924